Bernhard Russi (born 20 August 1948) is a former World Cup alpine ski racer from Switzerland. Born in Andermatt in the canton of Uri, he is an Olympic, World Cup, and World champion in the downhill event.

Racing career
Russi made his World Cup debut at age 19 in January 1968 at a giant slalom in Adelboden.  After two races in 1968 and six in 1969, he joined the World Cup circuit full-time in December 1969. However, his racing career was set back at this time by his work as a stuntman in the movie On Her Majesty’s Secret Service which was filmed in Switzerland and during which he fractured a cervical vertebra. After a period of rehabilitation from this injury, he was able, for the first time in several months, to compete in the Downhill Race at Val d'Isère on December 14, 1969, in which he placed 14th. He gained World Cup Points by recording his first World Cup top ten finish (tenth in the Downhill on January 10 on the Lauberhorn piste in Wengen). He went on to achieve a fourth place in the Downhill at Garmisch-Partenkirchen on February 1, leading to him being selected for the Swiss team at the 1970 World Championships, where he won his first event, the downhill, ahead of Karl Cordin of Austria and Australian Malcolm Milne. It was a race with fresh snow, and he was the 15th racer on the start list - a good number for such conditions. He won despite suffering a hand fracture a week before in a practice race, contending with the pain during his winning run. Notably, he skied his winning run without ski wax as his coach Paul Berlinger scraped the wax off his skis directly before the start. Because the World Championships counted towards the World Cup at this time, his World Championship win was also his first World Cup race victory.         
Two years later at the 1972 Olympics in Sapporo, Japan, he won the gold medal in the same discipline on Mt. Eniwa. Countryman Roland Collombin secured the silver and a Swiss one-two. Russi won the World Cup season title in downhill in 1971 and 1972. That year, he was named as Swiss Sportsman of the Year for the second time, and he was also awarded with the Skieur d’Or, for the world's ski racer of the year, and the Étoile d’Or (the Gold Star).

His performance in the 1974 World Championships on home snow was disappointing; he was thirteenth in the downhill at St. Moritz. At the 1976 Olympics in Innsbruck, Austria, Russi nearly retained his Olympic title with a very fast time in the downhill at Patscherkofel, but took the silver medal. The third racer on the course, he finished 0.33 seconds behind Franz Klammer of Austria, who started fifteenth, the last of the top seeds. To date (2018) no men's Olympic champion in the downhill has successfully defended his title; Russi remains the sole defender to medal.

As in 1974, his performance in the 1978 World Championships at Garmisch was disappointing, finishing fourteenth in the downhill in late January. As a result of this, he retired from international competition a few days later with ten World Cup victories, 28 podiums, and 52 top ten finishes.  In addition to his two downhill titles in 1971 and 1972, Russi was second in 1973 and third in 1976 and 1977. His best finish in the overall standings was fifth, achieved three times in 1971, 1972, and 1977.

From 1948 through 1980, the Winter Olympics also served as the world championships for alpine skiing.  During the early seasons of the World Cup, the Olympics (1968) and world championships (1970) were included in the World Cup season standings; these major competitions were excluded beginning with the 1971 season.

After racing
Russi currently serves as the chairman of the FIS Alpine Committee and is a FIS technical advisor for downhill course design. Beginning with the 1988 Winter Olympics, Russi has been noted as a designer of downhill courses for the Olympics, and he has also designed such courses for the FIS Alpine Skiing World Championships. The Rattlesnake-course at Vail in 1989 was a "formidable challenge" to him. Another famous course of his was the La face de Bellevarde at Val-d’Isère (1992 Winter Olympics), and he was the construction supervisor for the Rosa Khutor course at Krasnaja Poljana (2014 Winter Olympics). This stemmed from dissatisfaction with the courses at the 1980 and 1984 games; since Russi took over, there have been few complaints.
He also serves as a commentator for alpine ski racing on Swiss television. - He also is a brand ambassador for Japanese car manufacturer Subaru and for several Swiss companies. After the end of his marriage to Michèle Rubi (a three-times Swiss Skiing Champion in 1970) he married Mari Bergström from Sweden. He has a son by his first wife and a daughter by his second.

World Cup results

Season titles

Season standings

Race podiums
10 wins – (9 DH, 1 GS)
28 podiums – (27 DH, 1 GS)

^ Results from the 1970 World Championships (and 1968 Winter Olympics) were included in the World Cup standings.

World championship results 

From 1948 through 1980, the Winter Olympics were also the World Championships for alpine skiing.

Olympic results

Video

References

External links
 
 
  

Swiss male alpine skiers
Olympic alpine skiers of Switzerland
Olympic gold medalists for Switzerland
Olympic silver medalists for Switzerland
Alpine skiers at the 1972 Winter Olympics
Alpine skiers at the 1976 Winter Olympics
Living people
1948 births
Olympic medalists in alpine skiing
FIS Alpine Ski World Cup champions
Medalists at the 1976 Winter Olympics
Medalists at the 1972 Winter Olympics
People from the canton of Uri